The 1920 Kentucky Wildcats football team represented the University of Kentucky as a member of the Southern Intercollegiate Athletic Association (SIAA) during the 1920 college football season. Led by first-year head coach William Juneau, the Wildcats compiled an overall record of 3–4–1 with a mark of 0–3–1 in SIAA play.

Schedule

References

Kentucky
Kentucky Wildcats football seasons
Kentucky Wildcats football